is a 1989 vertically scrolling shooter arcade video game developed and published by Taito in Japan. A port to the Sega Mega Drive was released in 1990.

Plot
An entire week of nuclear war on Earth destroys its global environment. The survivors of the war gather their strength and resources in an attempt to bring Earth back to the way it was. Using a super computer called God System, the survivors start their first step in rebuilding Earth by having the God System create machines capable cleaning and reconstructing much of what has been lost from the war. However, without warning, a mysterious mutant entity known as "N" takes over the God System; creating three strange guardian statues based on Greek mythological figures, N manipulates the God System's machines and programs in order to attack mankind. The survivors create an artificial human called Yukiwo – built to harness perfect dexterity and strength – as well as a super-powered jet for him to pilot in order to reclaim Earth from N.

Gameplay
The spaceship starts with a basic photon cannon and air-to-ground bombs. Both of these weapons can fire continuously without a need for pause. The photon cannon can be upgraded five times for up to five streams of photons by collecting P upgrades. Additionally, the exhaust of the ship can be used as a weapon.

Special Weapons
Special weapons can be collected by picking up boxes with specific labels through destroying transport vessels. These then upgrade the weaponry of the ship.

P (Piercing) – Essentially the same as the conventional air-to-ground bomb. This is the default special weapon.
L (Laser) – Very powerful but has a short range. It can attack both air and ground targets.
G (Guide) – Shoots several green projectiles that track all targets on screen, self-destruct, and destroy the target.
W (Wide) – A somewhat powerful launch of several projectiles in a star pattern
H (H-Bomb) – Destroys all enemies on the screen for a few seconds. Can only be used once.
S – Increases the exhaust of the ship, allows it to damage enemies at a further range and increases movement speed of the ship.

Reception
Game Machine listed Master of Weapon as being among the most popular arcade games in Japan of June 1989.

Notes

References

1989 video games
Arcade video games
Sega Genesis games
KID games
Vertically scrolling shooters
Video games scored by Hisayoshi Ogura
Video games scored by Yasuhisa Watanabe
Taito arcade games
Taito B System games
Video games developed in Japan